Lucy McKim Garrison (October 30, 1842 – May 11, 1877) was an American song collector and co-editor of Slave Songs of the United States, together with William Francis Allen and Charles Pickard Ware.

Early life
Lucy was born in Philadelphia, Pennsylvania on October 30, 1842. She was a daughter of Sarah Allibone ( Speakman) McKim and the Rev. James Miller McKim, an antislavery lecturer and Presbyterian minister. Her younger brother was Charles Follen McKim, a prominent architect with the firm of McKim, Mead & White, and her maternal grandfather was Micajah Speakman of Chester County, Pennsylvania, whose home was a stop on the Underground Railroad.

Poetry
She traveled to the Sea Islands of South Carolina with her father in 1862 while the Civil War was still raging, serving as his secretary as he gathered information on the conditions for newly freed slaves for the Philadelphia Port Royal Relief Committee. This exposed her to the music of former slaves just after they had been freed, a time of great social change. Her work in Port Royal, South Carolina constitutes the first attempt to systematically describe the characteristics of African American spirituals.  She published two songs, Poor Rosy, Poor and Roll, Jordon, Roll, they were the "earliest slave songs to be published complete with music".

Personal life
On December 6, 1865, Lucy was married to Wendell Phillips Garrison (a son of the abolitionist William Lloyd Garrison) in Philadelphia. Together, they were the parents of:

 Lloyd McKim Garrison (1867–1900), who married Alice Kirkham in 1896. After his death she married Frederic Wait Lord.
 Philip McKim Garrison (1869–1935), who married Marian Knight.
 Katherine McKim Garrison (1873–1948), who married banker Charles Dyer Norton, Assistant Secretary of the Treasury and Secretary to President William Howard Taft, in 1897.

Garrison died of heart disease after a long illness culminating in paralysis on May 11, 1877 in West Orange, New Jersey. She was survived by her husband and three children. Her story is told in a biography by musicologist Samuel Charters entitled, Songs of Sorrow: Lucy McKim Garrison and 'Slave Songs of the United States' .

Further reading
Charters, Samuel. Songs of Sorrow: Lucy Mckim Garrison and Slave Songs of the United States. Jackson : University Press of Mississippi, 2015.

References
 
 
 Epstein, Dena (1971). "Lucy McKim Garrison" in Notable American Women. Cambridge, Massachusetts: Belknap Press of Harvard University Press. 
 Bacon, Margaret Hope (Jan 1989): "Lucy McKim Garrison: Pioneer in Folk Music," Pennsylvania HIstory, 54:1-16.

Notes

1842 births
1877 deaths
American musicologists
American women musicologists
People from Philadelphia
19th-century American women musicians
19th-century musicologists